Asham is a corn-based Caribbean dessert. It is thought to have originated in Africa, with the name asham derived from the Akan word o-sĭám meaning "parched and ground corn". Other names include Brown George (Jamaica), asham (Grenada), sansam and chilli bibi (Trinidad), caan sham, casham and kasham (Belize).

It is made by shelling dry corn, parching it, and then grinding it finely. Salt or sugar can then be added to the mixture and it can be eaten dry or with water.

See also

Cocktion
Duckunoo
 List of desserts

References

Caribbean cuisine
Jamaican desserts
Trinidad and Tobago cuisine
Grenadian cuisine
Belizean cuisine
Desserts
Maize dishes